Euoplos is a genus of Australian armored trapdoor spiders that was first described by William Joseph Rainbow  in 1914.

Species
 it contains 24 species found in various geographical locations of Australia and Tasmania:
Euoplos bairnsdale (Main, 1995) – Australia (Victoria)
Euoplos ballidu (Main, 2000) – Australia (Western Australia)
Euoplos booloumba (Wilson & Rix, 2021) – Australia (Queensland)
Euoplos cornishi Rix, Wilson & Harvey, 2019 – Australia (Western Australia)
Euoplos crenatus Wilson, Rix & Raven, 2019 – Australia (Queensland)
Euoplos dignitas Wilson, Rix & Oliver, 2023 – Australia (Queensland)
Euoplos eungellaensis (Wilson, Harvey & Rix, 2022) – Australia (Queensland)
Euoplos festivus (Rainbow & Pulleine, 1918) – Australia (Western Australia)
Euoplos goomboorian Wilson, Rix & Raven, 2019 – Australia (Queensland)
Euoplos grandis Wilson & Rix, 2019 – Australia (Queensland)
Euoplos hoggi (Simon, 1908) – Australia (Western Australia, South Australia)
Euoplos inornatus (Rainbow & Pulleine, 1918) – Australia (Western Australia)
Euoplos jayneae (Wilson & Rix, 2021) – Australia (Queensland)
Euoplos kalbarri Rix, Wilson & Harvey, 2019 – Australia (Western Australia)
Euoplos mcmillani (Main, 2000) – Australia (Western Australia)
Euoplos ornatus (Rainbow & Pulleine, 1918) – Australia (Queensland)
Euoplos raveni (Wilson & Rix, 2021) – Australia (Queensland)
Euoplos regalis (Wilson & Rix, 2021) – Australia (Queensland)
Euoplos saplan Rix, Wilson & Harvey, 2019 – Australia (Western Australia)
Euoplos schmidti (Wilson & Rix, 2021) – Australia (Queensland)
Euoplos similaris (Rainbow & Pulleine, 1918) – Australia (Queensland)
Euoplos spinnipes Rainbow, 1914 (type) – Australia (Queensland)
Euoplos thynnearum Wilson, Rix & Raven, 2019 – Australia (Queensland)
Euoplos turrificus Wilson, Rix & Raven, 2019 – Australia (Queensland)
Euoplos variabilis (Rainbow & Pulleine, 1918) – Australia (Queensland, New South Wales)

See also
 List of Idiopidae species

References

External links

Idiopidae
Mygalomorphae genera
Spiders of Australia
Taxa named by William Joseph Rainbow